György Justus (1898–1945) was a Hungarian Jewish composer. His 1928 "Jazz Suite" for piano is featured on the 2008 album In Memoriam: Hungarian Composers, Victims Of The Holocaust.

References

1898 births
1945 deaths
20th-century composers
Hungarian Jews who died in the Holocaust
20th-century executions by Hungary